Adeno-associated virus integration site 1 is a viral integration site that in humans is encoded by the AAVS1 gene located on chromosome 19.

References

Further reading 

 
 

Genes on human chromosome 19